Paenarthrobacter nicotinovorans is a Gram-positive and aerobic bacterium species from the genus Paenarthrobacter. This bacterium has the ability to degrade atrazine, nicotine, and creatine. and produces nicotine dehydrogenase

References

Further reading

External links
Type strain of Arthrobacter nicotinovorans at BacDive -  the Bacterial Diversity Metadatabase

Bacteria described in 1992
Micrococcaceae